Loughandonning is a townland in Athlone, County Westmeath, Ireland. The townland is in the civil parish of St. Mary's.

The townland stands to the south of the city, with the Dublin–Westport/Galway railway line passing through the north of the area. The townland is bordered by Aghacocara, Cartrontroy, and Magheranerla to the east, and Loughanaskin and Ankers Bower to the south and west.

References 

Townlands of County Westmeath